Sheridan County School District #1 is a public school district based in Ranchester, Wyoming, United States.

Geography
Sheridan County School District #1 serves the western portion of Sheridan County, including the following communities:
Incorporated places
Town of Dayton
Town of Ranchester
Census-designated places (Note: All census-designated places are unincorporated.)
Big Horn
Parkman

Schools

Secondary schools
Grades 9-12
Tongue River High School
Grades 6-12
Big Horn Middle/High School
Grades 6-8
Tongue River Middle School

Elementary schools
Grades K-5
Big Horn Elementary School
Tongue River Elementary School
Grades K-4
Slack Elementary School

Student demographics
The following figures are as of October 1, 2009.
Total District Enrollment: 923
Student enrollment by gender
Male: 464 (50.27%)
Female: 459 (49.73%)
Student enrollment by ethnicity
American Indian or Alaska Native: 43 (4.66%)
Black or African American: 1 (0.11%)
Hispanic or Latino: 41 (4.44%)
Native Hawaiian or Other Pacific Islander: 2 (0.22%)
Two or More Races: 9 (0.98%)
White: 827 (89.60%)

See also
List of school districts in Wyoming

References

External links
Sheridan County School District #1 – official site.

Education in Sheridan County, Wyoming
School districts in Wyoming